Masoud Soleimani is an Iranian who was imprisoned in the United States on October 25, 2018, charged with attempting to export biological materials from the US to Iran without authorization without bail and held in prison until his release from custody in a prisoner swap on December 11, 2019, for Xiyue Wang. Masoud Soleimani was invited by the Mayo Clinic in Minnesota to lead a research program. Upon his arrival in the United States, he was arrested and transferred to a prison in Atlanta.

Detention in the United States
Masoud Soleimani traveled to the US where he planned to complete the final stage of his research on treating stroke patients as a visiting scholar at the prestigious Mayo Clinic in Minnesota.

He was arrested on landing in Chicago and prosecutors in Atlanta accused him and two of his former students of conspiring and attempting to export biological materials from the US to Iran without authorization.

According to court documents, Soleimani's former student Mahboobe Ghaedi bought the growth factors on his behalf in early 2016. At the time, Ghaedi was a researcher in laboratory medicine at Yale University School of Medicine in New Haven, Connecticut. Now a principal scientist at the pharmaceutical firm AstraZeneca in Gaithersburg, Maryland, Ghaedi told Nature that she purchased the proteins in part because they are cheaper and more readily available in the United States than in Iran.

Ghaedi then sent the vials to another former student of Soleimani's, Maryam Jazayeri, a biochemist in Louisville, Kentucky. Jazayeri had agreed to take the growth factors to Soleimani during her next trip to visit family in Iran. But when she tried to board her plane at the Atlanta airport in September 2016, US border agents searched her luggage and confiscated the growth factors.

Jazayeri had no further contact with US law-enforcement officials until February 2018, when she was again stopped by border agents at the Atlanta airport. They asked her about the vials they had confiscated in 2016, and Jazayeri said that she had agreed to transport the growth factors to Soleimani as a favor, without knowing that this was prohibited. According to court documents, she also told the agents that the proteins were to be used for “medical purposes such as stem cell research, cancer research, and transplantation”.

Eight months later, on 24 October 2018, a federal grand jury indicted all three scientists under seal — or behind closed doors — on two counts of conspiring to export goods to Iran without authorization. At the time, Soleimani was en route to the United States to take up a temporary research position at the Mayo Clinic in Rochester, Minnesota. Federal agents arrested him when he arrived in the United States on 25 October, and the government also revoked his visa. Ghaedi, a US permanent resident, and Jazayeri, a US citizen who was born in Iran, were arrested soon afterwards.

The crime he was charged for would usually result in fine but in this case the imprisonment seemed to be politically motivated. “I don’t see any evidence that there was criminal intent here,” says Clif Burns, a lawyer at Crowell & Moring in Washington DC who specializes in national-security law, including export controls and trade sanctions. The attorneys for Jazayeri filed a motion to dismiss the charges, arguing that the Iranian sanctions were unconstitutionally vague as applied to the growth factors Jazayeri had in her possession and that, regardless, the growth factors were exempted from the export ban because they had a medicinal purpose.

On December 8, 2019 president Donald Trump thanked Tehran for “a very fair negotiation” and said: “See, we can make a deal together!”. The charges against Jazayeri and Ghaedi were subsequently dropped.

References

External links

1970 births
Living people
Scientists from Isfahan
Iranian hematologists
University of Tehran alumni
Tarbiat Modares University alumni
Academic staff of Tarbiat Modares University
21st-century biologists
Stem cell researchers
Iranian people imprisoned in the United States